The Croatian Handball Federation (abbr. HRS) is the governing body of handball in Croatia. It is based in Zagreb.

It organizes the handball leagues:
 Croatian Men's Premier Handball League
 Croatian Women's First Handball League
 Croatian Second League of Handball

It also organizes the Croatian men's national handball team and the Croatian women's national handball team, as well as the Croatian men's national beach handball team and Croatian women's national beach handball team.

History
The Handball Working Committee was first formed in Zagreb in 1948 and the following year the HRS itself was formed within the Independent State of Croatia. After the Second World War, it was renamed the Handball Federation of Croatia and ceded some powers to the Yugoslav Handball Federation. Upon Croatia's independence from Yugoslavia, the Croatian Handball Federation again represented the country. It joined the European Handball Federation and the International Handball Federation in 1992.

HRS presidents

Competitions hosted

International
 1957 World Women's Handball Championship (as part of SFR Yugoslavia)
 1973 World Women's Handball Championship (as part of SFR Yugoslavia)
 1979 Women's Junior World Handball Championship (as part of SFR Yugoslavia)
 1987 Men's Junior World Handball Championship (as part of SFR Yugoslavia)
 2003 World Women's Handball Championship
 2009 World Men's Handball Championship
 2014 Women's Junior World Handball Championship

Continental
 2000 European Men's Handball Championship
 2011 European Beach Handball Championship
 2014 European Women's Handball Championship
 2016 European Men's U-18 Handball Championship
 2017 European Beach Handball Championship
 2018 European Men's Handball Championship

External links 
 Croatian Handball Federation

Federation, Croatian Handball
Handball
European Handball Federation
Sports organizations established in 1948